Jarred J. Adams (born 26 September 1996) is a Samoan rugby union player who plays as a prop for  in the Bunnings NPC. He also plays for the New Orleans Gold in Major League Rugby (MLR) in the U.S.

Career 
Adams attended Wesley College and made his provincial debut for Counties Manukau in 2016. He then made 29 appearances for Auckland between 2018 and 2020. Adams signed with Manawatu for the 2021 Bunnings NPC season.

References

1996 births
Living people
Rugby union props
Sunwolves players
Samoan rugby union players
Counties Manukau rugby union players
Auckland rugby union players
Munakata Sanix Blues players
Manawatu rugby union players
Northland rugby union players
New Orleans Gold players